Benjamin Charles Elton (born 3 May 1959) is a British comedian, actor, author, playwright, lyricist and director. He was a part of London's alternative comedy movement of the 1980s and became a writer on the sitcoms The Young Ones and Blackadder, as well as continuing as a stand-up comedian on stage and television. His style in the 1980s was left-wing political satire. Since then he has published 17 novels and written the musicals The Beautiful Game (2000), We Will Rock You (2002), Tonight's the Night (2003), and Love Never Dies (2010), the sequel to The Phantom of the Opera. His novels cover the dystopian, comedy, and crime genres.

Early life and education
Elton was born on 3 May 1959 at University College Hospital in Fitzrovia, London, the son of Mary (née Foster), an English teacher from Cheshire, and physicist and educational researcher Professor Lewis Elton. He is a nephew of the historian Sir Geoffrey Elton and a third cousin of singer Olivia Newton-John. Elton's father is from a German-Jewish family and Elton's mother, who was raised in the Church of England, is of British background.

Elton grew up in Catford, south London, before moving with his family to Guildford, Surrey in 1968, where he became involved in amateur dramatics groups. Reflecting on those times at an event in Guildford in 2013, Elton said: 
Raised in a loving non-religious home, he is an atheist. Elton studied at Stillness Junior School and Godalming Grammar School in Surrey, before leaving home at age 16 to study theatre at South Warwickshire College in Stratford-upon-Avon, where he took and passed A-levels in English, History and Theatre Studies. In 1977 he went to study Drama at the University of Manchester, where he met Rik Mayall and Ade Edmondson, and in 1980 he graduated with upper second-class honours.

Work

Television
Upon university graduation in 1980, Elton joined the BBC and became their youngest ever scriptwriter.

His first television appearance came in 1981 as a stand-up performer on the BBC1 youth and music programme Oxford Road Show. His first TV success, at 23, came as co-writer of the television sitcom The Young Ones, in which he occasionally appeared.

In 1983/84 he wrote and appeared in Granada Television's sketch show Alfresco, which was also notable for early appearances by Stephen Fry, Hugh Laurie, Emma Thompson and Robbie Coltrane. In 1985, Elton produced his first solo script for the BBC with his comedy-drama series Happy Families, starring Jennifer Saunders and Adrian Edmondson. Elton appeared in the fifth episode as a liberal prison governor. Shortly afterwards, he reunited Rik Mayall and Edmondson with their Young Ones co-star Nigel Planer for the showbiz send-up sitcom Filthy, Rich and Catflap.

In 1985 Elton began his writing partnership with Richard Curtis. Together they wrote  Blackadder II, Blackadder the Third (in one episode, Elton appeared as a bomb-wielding anarchist), Blackadder Goes Forth and a failed sitcom pilot for Madness. Blackadder, starring Rowan Atkinson, was a worldwide hit, winning four BAFTAs and an Emmy.

Elton and Curtis were inspired to write Blackadder Goes Forth upon finding World War I to be apt for a situation comedy. This series, which dealt with greater, darker themes than prior Blackadder episodes, was praised for Curtis's and Elton's scripts, in particular the final episode. Before writing the series, the pair read about the war and found that: 

Elton and Curtis also wrote Atkinson's 1986 stage show The New Revue, and Mr. Bean's "exam" episode.

Elton became a stand-up comedian primarily to showcase his own writing, but became one of Britain's biggest live comedy acts. After a regular slot on Saturday Live – later moved and renamed Friday Night Live  – which was seen as a UK version of the US's Saturday Night Live, he became the host of the programme.

In 1990 he starred in his own stand-up comedy and sketch series, Ben Elton: The Man from Auntie, which had a second series in 1994. (The title plays on The Man from UNCLE: "Auntie" is a nickname for the BBC.) In 1989 Elton won the Royal Television Society Writers' Award.

The Ben Elton Show (1998) followed a format similar to The Man from Auntie and featured Ronnie Corbett, a comedian of the old guard that the "alternative comedians" of the 1980s were the direct alternative to, as a regular guest. It was Elton's last high-profile network programme in the UK as a stand-up comedian.

Elton wrote the six-part sitcom Blessed, starring Ardal O'Hanlon as a record producer, first broadcast on BBC1 in 2005. No further series was commissioned.

In April 2007, Get a Grip, a new show, began on ITV1. Featuring comic sketches similar to those on The Ben Elton Show and staged studio discussion between Elton and 23-year-old Alexa Chung, the show's aim was to "contrast Elton's middle-aged viewpoint with Chung's younger perspective" (although Elton was responsible for the scripts).

In Third Way Magazine, Elton accused the BBC of allowing jokes about vicars but not imams. "And I believe that part of it is due to the genuine fear that the authorities and the communities have about provoking the radical elements of Islam".

On 10 October 2010, Elton headlined the first episode of Dave's One Night Stand.

Elton worked on Ben Elton Live From Planet Earth, a live one-hour comedy show which debuted on 8 February 2011 on the Nine Network in Australia. Live from Planet Earth was axed by the Nine Network on Wednesday 23 February 2011 after three episodes, despite having six commissioned. The show's final airing rated 200,000 viewers.

In 2016 Elton wrote the sitcom Upstart Crow, parodying the writing and family life of William Shakespeare, and starring David Mitchell as Shakespeare. This programme ran for a second series in 2017, and a third series in 2018.

As writer and producer
Elton wrote and produced The Thin Blue Line, a studio-based sitcom set in a police station, also starring Rowan Atkinson, which ran for two series in 1995 and 1996. A prime-time family show, its traditional format and characters won it the 1995 British Comedy Award and both the public and professional Jury Awards at Reims.

In 2012 a new sitcom for BBC1 was commissioned, written and produced by Elton starring David Haig. Filming for a full six-part series of the sitcom The Wright Way (formerly known as Slings and Arrows) was completed in late February 2013. It debuted in April 2013 to negative reviews.

Friday Night Live

Elton returned to live British television on Channel 4 on 21 October 2022 as "Ringmaster" Host to a satirical 90 minute stand up comedy night, celebrating the channel’s 40th anniversary of the founding of Channel 4 (as a free to air broadcaster in the UK) and as part of their Truth and Dare season. Speaking to Adrian Chiles on BBC Radio 5 on broadcast day, Elton readily admitted that because of the fluid UK political situation, "I honestly haven't written the first five minutes yet!"

Radio 
Elton starred with Adrian Edmondson in a sitcom based on the song "Teenage Kicks" for BBC Radio 2. A television version of Teenage Kicks for ITV has been made; Elton appeared in the pilot but was replaced by Mark Arden when it went to series production.

Novels 
He has authored 16 novels since 1989, the first four published by Simon and Schuster, and the rest by Transworld.
 Stark (1989)
 Gridlock (1991)
 This Other Eden (1993)
 Popcorn (1996)
 Blast from the Past (1998)
 Inconceivable (1999)
 Dead Famous (2001)
 High Society (2002)
 Past Mortem (2004)
 The First Casualty (2005)
 Chart Throb (2006)
 Blind Faith (2007)
 Meltdown (2010)
 Two Brothers (2012)
 Time and Time Again (2014)
 Identity Crisis (2019)
On a publicity tour for Past Mortem in 2004, Elton mused on the high school reunion theme and his own drama college reunion: We'd had a very happy time all together, so there were no old scores to be settled really, we'd been a pretty happy bunch. And yet one person, who'd been a bit of a golden boy – he certainly went out with a girl I was besotted and unrequitedly in love with – he came up and he said, 'Why did you come? Was it to show off?' That really surprised me, that anyone would think that ... he came kind of carrying my agenda. It was weird. I hasten to add I didn't think my life to be more successful than anybody else's. If you're happy and honest and fulfilled in what you do, then you're having a successful life.

Films 
Ben Elton appeared in amateur dramatic productions as a youth, notably as The Artful Dodger in the musical Oliver! 

While in bit parts in his own TV series, he began professional film acting as CD in Stark, the Australian/BBC TV series adaptation of his novel, in 1993. This was directed by Nadia Tass and filmed in Australia.

Elton played Verges in Kenneth Branagh's film adaptation of William Shakespeare's Much Ado About Nothing, also in 1993.

Behind the camera 
Elton wrote and directed the film adaptation of his novel Inconceivable, under the title Maybe Baby (2000) starring Hugh Laurie and Joely Richardson. It was a moderate UK success and distributed globally. The film was also nominated for a prize at Germany's Emden Film Festival.

In 2015, Elton wrote a Wiggles song for the Wiggle Town DVD and CD: The Wonder of Wiggle Town.

In September 2016, filming began in Western Australia on Three Summers, a romantic comedy film written and directed by Elton, which was released in 2017.

Elton wrote All is True, released 2018, a speculative story of William Shakespeare's years in Stratford-upon-Avon after his retirement from the theatre and move from London. Along with the filmcraft and acting, returning collaboration with Kenneth Branagh, All is True shows Elton giving a more serious and biographical perspective to some of the same characters who appear in Upstart Crow.

Musicals 
Elton collaborated with Andrew Lloyd Webber on The Beautiful Game in 2000, writing the book and lyrics (Lloyd Webber wrote the music). The Beautiful Game won the London Critics Circle Award for best new musical.

He went on to write compilation shows featuring popular songs from the catalogues of pop/rock artists. The first was the musical We Will Rock You with music by Queen. Despite unfavourable early reaction, this was successful in the West End and won the 2003 Theatregoers' Choice Award for Best New Musical. It has since opened in the US, Australia, Russia, Spain, South Africa, Japan, Germany, Switzerland, Sweden, Canada, and The Netherlands. Elton also directed the 10th Anniversary Arena tour, in 2013. The musical ran for 12 years in London.

His second compilation musical was Tonight's the Night, based on the songs of Rod Stewart, which opened in London's West End in November 2003.

Elton worked with Andrew Lloyd Webber on the musical Love Never Dies, which opened in London's West End in 2010. It was the sequel to Lloyd Webber's The Phantom of the Opera (1986).

It has been announced that Ben Elton will direct a new 20th anniversary tour of We Will Rock You, opening in February 2022 and visiting over 25 cities in the United Kingdom.

Stage 
Elton has written five West End plays.

 Gasping (1990) was first performed at the Theatre Royal Haymarket, London. It starred Hugh Laurie and featured the voice of Stephen Fry.
 Silly Cow (1991) again at the Theatre Royal Haymarket, London. It was written for and starred Dawn French.
 Popcorn (1996) was adapted for the stage and went on a UK tour. It also toured Australia in a production starring Marcus Graham and Nadine Garner in its Eastern-States seasons. Popcorn won the TMA Barclays Theatre Award for new play and the Olivier Award for comedy. The Paris production of Popcorn ran for a year and was nominated for seven Molière awards.
 Blast From the Past (1998) was also adapted for the stage and was produced at the West Yorkshire Playhouse.
 Elton's play The Upstart Crow, like the TV series Upstart Crow a comic version of Shakespeare's life and society, and sharing some of the same actors and characters, opened in London on 7 February 2020.

Stand-up comedy 
In 1981 Elton was hired by The Comedy Store in London as compère.

He made two albums of comedy, Motormouth (1987) and Motorvation (1988).

In 2005 Elton toured for the first time since 1997, touring the UK with Get a Grip. He toured Australia and New Zealand with the same show in 2006.

In September 2019, Elton embarked on a three-month UK stand-up tour, his first tour since 2005.

The New Zealand leg of the tour was interrupted in February 2020 by the COVID-19 pandemic. He resumed it over a year later once trans-Tasman quarantine-free travel was launched.

Awards 
Elton received an honorary doctorate in 2004, from The University of Manchester. In 2007 he was awarded an Honorary Rose for lifetime achievement at the Rose d'Or festival, and was also made a Companion of the Liverpool Institute for Performing Arts, in recognition of his work with students. He has won 3 BAFTAs for Best Comedy Series for The Young Ones, Blackadder the Third and Blackadder Goes Forth. Popcorn and We Will Rock You each won an Olivier Award and The Beautiful Game was awarded the Best Musical at the Critics' Circle Awards. The Man From Auntie won him a Royal Television Society Writer's Award and The Thin Blue Line won a British Comedy Award as well as Jury Award at Reims.

His books have won the Crime Writers Association Gold Dagger Award for Crime Fiction (Popcorn), the Swedish Kaliber Award (Popcorn), WH Smiths People's Choice Fiction Award (High Society) and Prix Polar International Crime Writer Award (Amitiès Mortelles for Past Mortem, French edition).

Personal life
Elton first met 18 year old Australian saxophone player Sophie Gare in 1986 while working in Melbourne (he had a girlfriend called Kate at the time); a year later in Edinburgh, a newly-single Elton rekindled their friendship and they became a couple. The two married in 1994 and have three children (including twins). They decided to settle in North Fremantle, Western Australia and they also maintain a home in East Sussex, England. Elton holds dual British/Australian citizenship, the latter since 2004. He has speculated on a future move back to London when their children have completed their schooling.

He has the distinction of being nominated twice for TV's Room 101, firstly by broadcaster Anne Robinson in 2001 and also by comedian Stewart Lee who compared Elton, "as ranking lower ethically than Osama bin Laden".

Political views
Elton champions left-wing political positions. Prior to the 1987 UK general election, Elton supported Red Wedge by participating in a comedy tour organised by the campaign.

He was a Labour Party supporter and was one of the biggest private financial donors to the party. However, Elton distanced himself for over 20 years from the Party under Tony Blair, Gordon Brown and New Labour in the mid-1990s, instead donating to and voting for the Green Party, although in April 2015, he stated that he was "back with Labour" for the 2015 general election. Describing his brand of satire in 2022 as a criticism of those in power, he encouraged the Channel 4 viewing audience to elect Labour.

Elton has been criticised for writing a musical with Conservative Party supporter Andrew Lloyd Webber. In his defence, Elton said: "If I were to refuse to talk to Tories, I would narrow my social and professional scope considerably. If you judge all your relationships on a person's voting intentions, I think you miss out on the varieties of life."

Elton says of his criticism: "I would have loved a honeymoon period, but I've been irritating journos from the beginning. Originally I was knocked for being too left-wing, and now apparently I've sold out and I'm too right-wing, but all the time I've been being me, and that certainly isn't the person I recognise in anything that's written about me." He has denied being anti-establishment. He also said he was a socialist at a time when "the media was on the whole slavishly worshipping of Thatcher". He said of his political views "I believe in the politics of Clement Attlee. I'm a Welfare State Labour voter."

He parodied himself in the sketch "Benny Elton" for Harry Enfield and Chums in 1994, using the style of Benny Hill to send up his (Elton's) "right on" socialist image as a politically correct spoilsport, chasing Page 3 models around a park to chastise them and tricking heterosexual couples into becoming gay.

References

External links

 
theartsdesk Q&A: Ben Elton (9 October 2010)
 Interview with Andrew Denton on ABC TV Australia
 BBC Comedy Guide – Ben Elton
 
 

1959 births
Living people
English male comedians
English comedy writers
English dramatists and playwrights
English humorists
English musical theatre lyricists
20th-century English novelists
21st-century English novelists
English satirists
English stand-up comedians
English television writers
English atheists
English people of German-Jewish descent
English socialists
People from Catford
Alumni of the Victoria University of Manchester
Naturalised citizens of Australia
People educated at Godalming Grammar School
English male radio actors
English male television actors
Male actors from London
Labour Party (UK) people
English emigrants to Australia
English male dramatists and playwrights
English male novelists
People from Guildford
20th-century English comedians
21st-century English comedians
British male television writers
British surrealist writers
Ehrenberg family